South Johnston High School (also referred to as "South") is a high school for grades 9–12 located in Four Oaks, North Carolina, near Benson.  The school was built in 1969 in order to integrate the area's "all-white" and "all-black" schools. The principal is William Weaver, one of the former assistant principals at the school.

The school is located in the Southern portion of Johnston County.  Middle schools that feed into South Johnston include Benson Middle School, Four Oaks Middle School, and Meadow School (K–8).

Sports
The school mascot of South Johnston is the Trojan, and the school colors are green and Vegas gold.

SJHS offers a variety of sports which includes: volleyball, American football, cross country, wrestling, boys' and girls' tennis, boys' and girls' swimming, softball, baseball, boys' and girls' soccer, golf, boys' and girls' indoor & outdoor track, cheerleading, and boys' and girls' basketball.  The boys' soccer team has been conference champions in three consecutive occasions (2009–2011).  In 2009, the football team were state runner-ups.

References

External links
 Official Homepage

Educational institutions established in 1969
Public high schools in North Carolina
Schools in Johnston County, North Carolina
1969 establishments in North Carolina